Oranssi Pazuzu is a Finnish psychedelic black metal band formed in 2007. The band originally consisted of vocalist and guitarist Juho "Jun-His" Vanhanen, drummer Jarkko "Korjak" Salo, guitarist Moit, keyboardist and percussionist Ville "Evil" Leppilahti, and bassist Toni "Ontto" Hietamäki. Moit left the band in 2016 and was replaced by Niko "Ikon" Lehdontie of Kairon; IRSE!.

The band takes its name from "oranssi", the Finnish word for "orange", and Pazuzu, a wind demon from Babylonian mythology.

History
The band recorded their debut album, Muukalainen puhuu in 2008 in Korjak's family cabin. It was released via Violent Journey Records in 2009 and followed in 2010 by a split LP with Candy Cane. Their second full-length album, Kosmonument, was released in 2011 through Spinefarm. In 2013, Svart issued the follow-up, Valonielu which was produced and engineered by London-based producer Jaime Gomez Arellano. The band's album Värähtelijä was released in 2016 and received positive reviews from music outlets such as AllMusic, Pitchfork and Spin. Lehdontie, of fellow Finnish band Kairon; IRSE!, joined Oranssi Pazuzu in 2016 first as a live member and later on as a full-time member. In 2017, the band released the two-track EP Kevät / Värimyrsky. The band released their fifth album Mestarin kynsi in 2020.

AllMusic's James Christopher Monger described the band's music as a combination of black metal, psychedelic rock, space rock, and progressive metal.

Two members of Oranssi Pazuzu and two members of Dark Buddha Rising have formed band Atomikylä. Oranssi Pazuzu is also part of the Wastement collective.

Members

Current
 Jarkko "Korjak" Salo – drums 
 Ville "Evil" Leppilahti – percussion, keyboards, vocals 
 Toni "Ontto" Hietamäki – bass guitar, vocals 
 Juho "Jun-His" Vanhanen – vocals, guitars 
 Niko "Ikon" Lehdontie – guitars

Former
 Moit – guitars

Discography
Studio albums
 Muukalainen puhuu (2009) 
 Kosmonument (2011)
 Valonielu (2013)
 Värähtelijä (2016)
 Mestarin kynsi (2020)

EPs
 Kevät / Värimyrsky (2017)

Splits
 Candy Cane / Oranssi Pazuzu (2010)

Compilations
 "Tasapaino", included in Rabbit Ilsn Records Compilation Vol. 1 (2010)
 "Reikä Maisemassa", included in Space Rock: an Interstellar Traveler's Guide (2016)

References

External links

 

Musical groups established in 2007
Finnish black metal musical groups
Musical quintets
Avant-garde metal musical groups
Finnish psychedelic rock music groups
Finnish doom metal musical groups